Pasławki  is a village in the administrative district of Gmina Sępopol, within Bartoszyce County, Warmian-Masurian Voivodeship. It is in northern Poland, close to the border with the Kaliningrad Oblast of Russia.

The village has a population of 50.

References

Villages in Bartoszyce County